This is a 'list of Cincinnati Bearcats football players in the NFL draft.

Key

 Selections 

Notes
George Jamison was drafted in the 1984 NFL supplemental draft.

Notable undrafted playersNote: No drafts held before 1920''

References

Cincinnati

Bearcats in the NFL Draft
Cincinnati Bearcats NFL draft